Satapliasaurus is an extinct genus of  theropod dinosaur known from multiple well-preserved trackways. Satapliasarus is known from three ichnospecies: S. dsocenidzei, Satapliasaurus kandelakii (ichnospecies) and Satapliasaurus tschabukianii. The fossils and trackways have been found in Cretaceous sediments of Georgia and the Middle Jurassic of England. Satapliasaurus dsocenidzei, the type species, was described based on an isolated, 25 centimeter long footprint preserving a hallux mark that was collected from the Cleveland Basin, the basin dating to the Middle Jurassic.

References

Dinosaur trace fossils
Ichnology